

List of Mayors

References

External links
مدونة الدكتور ابراهيم العلاف (needs translation); (in Arabic); Walla News blog; accessed October 2015.

Government of Baghdad